"Sobri" is the second single from French singer Leslie, as a duet with Amine.

Track listing
 "Sobri 2"
 "Sobri 2" (Club Mix - with Six Coups MC)
 "Sobri 2" (Videoclip)

Charts

References

2006 singles
Amine (singer) songs
Leslie (singer) songs
Rhythm and blues songs